Poliothyrsis is a genus of flowering plants belonging to the family Salicaceae. It contains a single arborescent species, Poliothyrsis sinensis.

Its native range is China.

References

Salicaceae
Salicaceae genera
Endemic flora of China
Monotypic Malpighiales genera